Veronika Koller (born 1973) is an Austrian-British linguist. She is currently Reader in Discourse Studies at the Department of Linguistics and English Language of Lancaster University, United Kingdom. Her research focuses on critical discourse analysis.

Education 
Koller received an MA in English literature (with  minor in Arabic language and Islamic Studies) from the  University of Vienna in 1998, and a Ph.D in English linguistics from the same university in 2003 with a thesis "Metaphor clusters in business media discourse:a social cognition approach."

Career 
Between 1999 and 2001, Koller was an external lecturer for Business English at the Polytechnic of Wiener Neustadt. Between 1999 and 2002, she was also an external lecturer at the Institute of Business Development of Vienna.

In 2000, she became an Assistant Professor at the Department of English Business Communication of Vienna University of Economics and Business.  In 2004, she was appointed  Lecturer in English Language at the Department of Linguistics and English Language of Lancaster University, and promoted to Senior Lecturer there in 2008. In 2015, she became Reader in Discourse Studies. 

Additionally, she also does occasional language consulting work for private, public and third sector clients.

Research
One of Koller's  best known work is  Discourses of Brexit, published by Routledge in 2019. Edited along with Susanne Kopf and Marlene Miglbauer, the book provides an insight into how discourse influenced the outcome of the 2016 United Kingdom European Union membership referendum. The authors analysed political speeches on Twitter and other related platforms to analyse discourses regarding the Brexit.

Publications

Books 

Koller, V., Kopf, S., & Miglbauer, M. (Eds.) (2019). Discourses of Brexit. Abingdon: Routledge. 
Darics, E., & Koller, V. (2018). Language in Business, Language at Work. London : Palgrave Higher Education. 
translated into Chinese (2014) as 商务媒体话语中的隐喻与性别 /Shang wu mei ti hua yu zhong de yin yu yu xing bie 
Wodak, Ruth, and Veronika Koller. (Eds)  (2010) Handbook of Communication in the Public Sphere. Berlin: Mouton de Gruyter. 
Koller, Veronika. (2010) Lesbian Discourses: Images of a Community. New York: Routledge,. 
Koller, Veronika. (2008) Metaphor and Gender in Business Media Discourse A Critical Cognitive Study. Basingstoke: Palgrave Macmillan. 
translated into Chinese (2014) as 商务媒体话语中的隐喻与性别 /Shang wu mei ti hua yu zhong de yin yu yu xing bie

Articles
Heritage, F., & Koller, V. (2020). Incels, in-groups, and ideologies: The representation of gendered social actors in a sexuality-based online community. Journal of Language and Sexuality, 9(2), 152-178. doi:
Koller, V., & Miglbauer, M. (2019). What Drives the Right-Wing Populist Vote? Topics, motivations and representations in an online vox pop with voters for the Alternative für Deutschland. Zeitschrift für Anglistik und Amerikanistik, 67(3), 283-306. doi:
Darics, E., & Koller, V. (2019). Social actors “to go”: An analytical toolkit to explore agency in business discourse and communication. Business and Professional Communication Quarterly, 82(2), 214-238. doi:
Koller, V., & Bullo, S. (2019). ‘Fight like a girl’: Tattoos as identity constructions for women living with illness. Multimodal Communication, 8(1). doi:
Koller, V. (2018). Language awareness and language workers. Language Awareness, 27(1-2), 4-20. doi:
Koller, V. (2017). The light within: metaphor consistency in Quaker pamphlets, 1659-2010. Metaphor and the Social World, 7(1), 5-25. doi:
Demjen, Z., Semino, E., & Koller, V. (2016). Metaphors for 'good' and 'bad' deaths: a health professional view. Metaphor and the Social World, 6(1), 1-19. doi:
Koller, V. (2015). The subversive potential of queer pornography: a systemic-functional analysis of a written online text. Journal of Language and Sexuality, 4(2), 254-271. doi:
Semino, E., Demjen, Z., & Koller, V. (2014). ‘Good’ and ‘bad’ deaths: narratives and professional identities in interviews with hospice managers. Discourse Studies, 16(5), 667-685. doi:
Koller, V. (2013). Constructing (non-)normative identities in written lesbian discourse: a diachronic study. Discourse and Society, 24(5), 551-568. doi:
Ng, C. J. W., & Koller, V. (2013). Deliberate conventional metaphor in images: the case of corporate branding discourse. Metaphor and Symbol, 28(3), 131-147. doi:
Merkl-Davies, D., & Koller, V. (2012). ‘Metaphoring’ people out of this world: a critical discourse analysis of a chairman’s statement of a UK defence firm. Accounting Forum, 36(3), 178-193. doi:

References

External links 
 

1972 births
Living people
Applied linguists
Women linguists
Linguists from Austria
Department of Linguistics and English Language, Lancaster University